Sefid Chah (also Romanized as Sefīd Chāh; also known as Sefīd Jāh) is a village in Shohada Rural District, Yaneh Sar District, Behshahr County, Mazandaran Province, Iran. At the 2006 census, its population was 99, in 26 families.

References 

Populated places in Behshahr County